Peter Gleane may refer to:

 Sir Peter Gleane (1564–1633) MP for Norwich 
Sir Peter Gleane, 1st Baronet (1619–1695), MP for Norfolk 
Sir Peter Gleane, 3rd Baronet (c. 1672–c. 1735), of the Gleane baronets
Sir Peter Gleane, 4th Baronet (c. 1696–1745), of the Gleane baronets

See also
Gleane (surname)